Teemu Kattilakoski (December 16, 1977 in Kannus) is a Finnish cross-country skier who has been competing since 1996. His best finish at the FIS Nordic World Ski Championships was sixth in the 4 × 10 km relay in 2007 while his best individual finish was eighth in the 50 km event in 2003.

Kattilakoski's best individual finish at the Winter Olympics was 27th in the 15 km event at Vancouver in 2010.

He has a total of four individual victories at various levels all at 10 km from 1998 to 2005.

He made an appearance in a commercial for Tide, playing one of the background civilians.

Cross-country skiing results
All results are sourced from the International Ski Federation (FIS).

Olympic Games

World Championships
 1 medal – (1 bronze)

World Cup

Season standings

Team podiums
1 victory – (1 ) 
3 podiums – (2 , 1 )

References

External links

Official website 

1977 births
Living people
People from Kannus
Cross-country skiers at the 2002 Winter Olympics
Cross-country skiers at the 2006 Winter Olympics
Cross-country skiers at the 2010 Winter Olympics
Finnish male cross-country skiers
Olympic cross-country skiers of Finland
FIS Nordic World Ski Championships medalists in cross-country skiing
Sportspeople from Central Ostrobothnia